William Legge, 2nd Earl of Dartmouth, PC, FRS (20 June 1731 – 15 July 1801), styled as Viscount Lewisham from 1732 to 1750, was a British statesman who is most remembered as the namesake of Dartmouth College.

Background
Dartmouth was the son of George Legge, Viscount Lewisham, who died when Dartmouth was one year old. His mother was Elizabeth, daughter of Sir Arthur Kaye, 3rd Baronet. Having entered Trinity College, Oxford, in 1748, he succeeded his grandfather in the earldom in 1750.

Political career

Lord Dartmouth was Secretary of State for the Colonies from 1772 to 1775. Lord Dartmouth's arrival in the Colonies was celebrated by Phillis Wheatley's famous poem, "To the Right Honourable William, Earl of Dartmouth."

It was Lord Dartmouth who, in 1764, at the suggestion of Thomas Haweis, recommended John Newton, the former slave trader and author of "Amazing Grace", to Edmund Keene, the Bishop of Chester. He was instrumental in Newton's acceptance for the Anglican ministry.

In 1772, in correspondence with Sir William Johnson, the Superintendent of Northern Indian Affairs in America, he suggested that there was no reasonable way the British Government could support new trade regulations with the Indians. 

He sympathised with Johnson's arguments but stated the Colonies did not seem inclined to concur with any new regulations.

Philanthropy

Lord Dartmouth was a large donor to and the leading trustee for the English trust that would finance the establishment of the Moor's Charity School, in Lebanon, Connecticut, by Eleazar Wheelock to educate and convert the Indians. 

Wheelock subsequently founded Dartmouth College in Hanover, New Hampshire, naming the school in Lord Dartmouth's honour, in hopes of getting his financial support. Lord Dartmouth refused. In London, Lord Dartmouth supported the new Foundling Hospital, a charitable institution for the care and maintenance of London's abandoned children. He served as a vice-president of the organisation from 1755 until his death. The famous painter Sir Joshua Reynolds painted the Earl's portrait and donated it to the hospital. 

The portrait is still in the Foundling Hospital Collection and can be seen at the Foundling Museum in London. He was admitted a Fellow of the Royal Society on 7 November 1754.

Marriage and children

Lord Dartmouth married Frances Catherine Nicholl, daughter of Sir Charles Gounter Nicoll, on 11 January 1755. They had nine children together:
 George Legge, 3rd Earl of Dartmouth (born 3 October 1755, died 10 November 1810)
Hon William Legge (born 4 February 1757)
Hon Charles Gounter Legge (born 18 May 1759)
Hon Heneage Legge (born 7 May 1761)
 Hon Henry Legge (born 23 January 1765, died 19 April 1844)
 Admiral the Hon Sir Arthur Kaye Legge KCB (born 25 October 1766, died 12 May 1835)
 Rt Rev and Hon Edward Legge (11 December 1767 - 27 January 1827), Bishop of Oxford 1816–27
The Ven and Hon Augustus George Legge (born 21 April 1773, died 1828), Archdeacon of Winchester 1814–19
 Lady Charlotte Legge (5 October 1774 - 5 November 1848), married Charles Duncombe, 1st Baron Feversham

Death
Dartmouth died at Blackheath, Kent, on 15 July 1801, aged 70. He was buried in Trinity Church in the Minories on 3 August 1801.

He was succeeded by his eldest son, George. Lady Dartmouth died in July 1805. The family lived at Sandwell Hall (since demolished) in Sandwell Valley.

References

Attribution

External links
 Biography, Arms, and Motto

|-

1731 births
1801 deaths
Alumni of Trinity College, Oxford
British officials in the American Revolution
Legge, William
2
English Methodists
Fellows of the Royal Society
William
Lords Privy Seal
Members of the Privy Council of Great Britain
Secretaries of State for the Colonies
Presidents of the Board of Trade
Foundling Hospital
British philanthropists
18th-century philanthropists